Cimarron is an unincorporated community in Harris County, Texas, United States.

History
Construction of the subdivision began in 1975, when the Homeowner association was incorporated, and the first house was constructed. The final house in the platted area was completed shortly after 1990.

Home values in the subdivision remained stable through the oil bust of the mid-1980s, and through the late-2000s recession. Local realtor Veronica Mullenix said of this tendency: “I think it’s pride of ownership more than anything else."

Education
Cimarron is in the Katy Independent School District. Residents are zoned to Cimarron Elementary School, West Memorial Junior High School, and Katy High School.

Parks and recreation
The subdivision maintains a recreation complex for its residents, which includes a clubhouse, a playground, a swimming pool, and tennis courts.

References

Unincorporated communities in Harris County, Texas
Unincorporated communities in Texas